UN numbers from UN0501 to UN0600 as assigned by the United Nations Committee of Experts on the Transport of Dangerous Goods are as follows:


UN 0501 to UN 0600

See also 
Lists of UN numbers

External links
ADR Dangerous Goods, cited on 4 June 2015.
UN Dangerous Goods List from 2015, cited on 4 June 2015.
UN Dangerous Goods List from 2013, cited on 4 June 2015.

Lists of UN numbers